In vector calculus, the gradient of a scalar-valued differentiable function  of several variables is the vector field (or vector-valued function)  whose value at a point  is the "direction and rate of fastest increase". Further, a point where the gradient is the zero vector is known as a stationary point. The gradient thus plays a fundamental role in optimization theory, where it is used to maximize a function by gradient ascent. In coordinate-free terms, the gradient of a function  may be defined by:

where df is the total infinitesimal change in f for an infinitesimal displacement  , and is seen to be maximal when  is in the direction of the gradient . The nabla symbol , written as an upside-down triangle and pronounced "del", denotes the vector differential operator.

The gradient is dual to the total derivative : the value of the gradient at a point is a tangent vector – a vector at each point; while the value of the derivative at a point is a cotangent vector – a linear functional on vectors.
The gradient admits multiple generalizations to more general functions on manifolds; see .

Motivation

The magnitude of the gradient will determine how fast the temperature rises in that direction.

The steepness of the slope at that point is given by the magnitude of the gradient vector.

The gradient can also be used to measure how a scalar field changes in other directions, rather than just the direction of greatest change, by taking a dot product. Suppose that the steepest slope on a hill is 40%. A road going directly uphill has slope 40%, but a road going around the hill at an angle will have a shallower slope. For example, if the road is at a 60° angle from the uphill direction (when both directions are projected onto the horizontal plane), then the slope along the road will be the dot product between the gradient vector and a unit vector along the road, namely 40% times the cosine of 60°, or 20%.

More generally, if the hill height function  is differentiable, then the gradient of  dotted with a unit vector gives the slope of the hill in the direction of the vector, the directional derivative of  along the unit vector.

Notation

It may also be denoted by any of the following:

  : to emphasize the vector nature of the result.
  
  and  : Einstein notation.

Definition

The gradient (or gradient vector field) of a scalar function  is denoted  or   where  (nabla) denotes the vector differential operator, del. The notation   is also commonly used to represent the gradient. That is,

where the right-side hand is the directional derivative and there are many ways to represent it. Formally, the derivative is dual to the gradient; see relationship with derivative.

When a function also depends on a parameter such as time, the gradient often refers simply to the vector of its spatial derivatives only (see Spatial gradient).

The magnitude and direction of the gradient vector are independent of the particular coordinate representation.

Cartesian coordinates
In the three-dimensional Cartesian coordinate system with a Euclidean metric, the gradient, if it exists, is given by:

For example, the gradient of the function

is

In some applications it is customary to represent the gradient as a row vector or column vector of its components in a rectangular coordinate system; this article follows the convention of the gradient being a column vector, while the derivative is a row vector.

Cylindrical and spherical coordinates

In cylindrical coordinates with a Euclidean metric, the gradient is given by:

In spherical coordinates, the gradient is given by:

For the gradient in other orthogonal coordinate systems, see Orthogonal coordinates (Differential operators in three dimensions).

General coordinates
Here, the upper index refers to the position in the list of the coordinate or component, so  refers to the second component—not the quantity  squared. The index variable  refers to an arbitrary element . Using Einstein notation, the gradient can then be written as:

 (Note that its dual is ),

where  and  refer to the unnormalized local covariant and contravariant bases respectively,  is the inverse metric tensor, and the Einstein summation convention implies summation over i  and j. 

 (and ),

where we cannot use Einstein notation, since it is impossible to avoid the repetition of more than two indices.

The latter expression evaluates to the expressions given above for cylindrical and spherical coordinates.

Relationship with derivative

Relationship with total derivative
The gradient is closely related to the total derivative (total differential) : they are transpose (dual) to each other.

While these both have the same components, they differ in what kind of mathematical object they represent: at each point, the derivative is a cotangent vector, a linear form (covector) which expresses how much the (scalar) output changes for a given infinitesimal change in (vector) input, while at each point, the gradient is a tangent vector, which represents an infinitesimal change in (vector) input. In symbols, the gradient is an element of the tangent space at a point, while the derivative is a map from the tangent space to the real numbers, . The tangent spaces at each point of  can be "naturally" identified with the vector space  itself, and similarly the cotangent space at each point can be naturally identified with the dual vector space  of covectors; thus the value of the gradient at a point can be thought of a vector in the original , not just as a tangent vector.

Computationally, given a tangent vector, the vector can be multiplied by the derivative (as matrices), which is equal to taking the dot product with the gradient:

Differential or (exterior) derivative
The best linear approximation to a differentiable function

Much as the derivative of a function of a single variable represents the slope of the tangent to the graph of the function, the directional derivative of a function in several variables represents the slope of the tangent hyperplane in the direction of the vector.

The gradient is related to the differential by the formula

for any , where  is the dot product: taking the dot product of a vector with the gradient is the same as taking the directional derivative along the vector.

If  is viewed as the space of (dimension ) column vectors (of real numbers), then one can regard  as the row vector with components

so that  is given by matrix multiplication.

Linear approximation to a function
The best linear approximation to a function can be expressed in terms of the gradient, rather than the derivative. The approximation is as follows:

Relationship with Fréchet derivative

where · is the dot product.

As a consequence, the usual properties of the derivative hold for the gradient, though the gradient is not a derivative itself, but rather dual to the derivative:

Linearity
Product rule
Chain rule
There are two forms of the chain rule applying to the gradient. First, suppose that the function  is a parametric curve; that is, a function  maps a subset  into . If  is differentiable at a point  such that , then  where ∘ is the composition operator: .

More generally, if instead , then the following holds:

where T denotes the transpose Jacobian matrix.

Then

Further properties and applications

Level sets

A level surface, or isosurface, is the set of all points where some function has a given value.

For example, a level surface in three-dimensional space is defined by an equation of the form .

More generally, any embedded hypersurface in a Riemannian manifold can be cut out by an equation of the form  such that  is nowhere zero.

Similarly, an affine algebraic hypersurface may be defined by an equation , where  is a polynomial. At a non-singular point, it is a nonzero normal vector.

Conservative vector fields and the gradient theorem

The gradient of a function is called a gradient field. A (continuous) gradient field is always a conservative vector field: its line integral along any path depends only on the endpoints of the path, and can be evaluated by the gradient theorem (the fundamental theorem of calculus for line integrals). Conversely, a (continuous) conservative vector field is always the gradient of a function.

Generalizations

Jacobian 

The Jacobian matrix is the generalization of the gradient for vector-valued functions of several variables and differentiable maps between Euclidean spaces or, more generally, manifolds.  A further generalization for a function between Banach spaces is the Fréchet derivative.

Explicitly

Gradient of a vector field

Since the total derivative of a vector field is a linear mapping from vectors to vectors, it is a tensor quantity.

In rectangular coordinates, the gradient of a vector field  is defined by:

Overall, this expression equals the transpose of the Jacobian matrix:

In curvilinear coordinates, or more generally on a curved manifold, the gradient involves Christoffel symbols:

Expressed more invariantly, the gradient of a vector field  can be defined by the Levi-Civita connection and metric tensor:

where  is the connection.

Riemannian manifolds

that is,

So, the local form of the gradient takes the form:

Generalizing the case , the gradient of a function is related to its exterior derivative, since

More precisely, the gradient  is the vector field associated to the differential 1-form  using the musical isomorphism

(called "sharp") defined by the metric .

See also

 Curl
 Divergence
 Four-gradient
 Hessian matrix
 Skew gradient

Notes

References

Further reading

External links

 
 .
 

Differential operators
Differential calculus
Generalizations of the derivative
Linear operators in calculus
Vector calculus
Rates